Milton Steinberg (November 25, 1903 – March 20, 1950) was an American rabbi, philosopher, theologian and author.

Life
Born in Rochester, New York, he was raised with the combination of his grandparents' traditional Jewish piety and his father's modernist socialism. He graduated as valedictorian of his class at DeWitt Clinton High School and then majored in Classics at City College of New York which he graduated from summa cum laude in 1924. Steinberg received his doctorate in philosophy from Columbia University in 1928 and then entered the Jewish Theological Seminary of America where he was ordained. In seminary, he was strongly influenced by Rabbi Mordecai Kaplan (1881–1983), the founder of  Reconstructionist Judaism.

After five years in a pulpit in Indiana, he was invited by the Seminary to assume the pulpit of Manhattan's Park Avenue Synagogue, then a small congregation with a Reform orientation. In his sixteen years at the congregation, he grew it from 120 to 750 families. In 1943 he had a near fatal heart attack.

While a disciple of Kaplan who considered himself a Reconstructionist, Steinberg was critical of Kaplan's dismissal of metaphysics.

Steinberg's works included Basic Judaism, The Making of the Modern Jew, A Partisan Guide to the Jewish Problem and As A Driven Leaf, a historical novel revolving around the talmudic characters Elisha ben Abuyah and Rabbi Akiva. In his final years, he began writing a series of theological essays. This project, which he had hoped would conclude in a book of theology, was cut short by his death at age 46.

An unfinished second novel, The Prophet's Wife, about the Tanakh characters Hosea and Gomer, was published in March 2010.

Publications

Non-fiction
 The Making of the Modern Jew (1934)
 A Partisan Guide to the Jewish Problem (1945)
 Basic Judaism (1947)
 A Believing Jew (1951)
 Anatomy of Faith (1960)

Novels
 As a Driven Leaf (1939)
 The Prophet's Wife (2010)

See also
Process theology

References
Noveck, Simon, "Milton Steinberg" in Kessner, Carole S., The "Other" New York Jewish Intellectuals, New York University Press, 1994.

External links
 Steinberg and Zionism
 Milton Steinberg Papers at the American Jewish Historical Society, New York and Boston, Massachusetts

1903 births
1950 deaths
20th-century American rabbis
American Conservative rabbis
American Reconstructionist rabbis
American Reform rabbis
American Zionists
City College of New York alumni
Jewish American writers
Jewish novelists
Jewish philosophers
American Jewish theologians
Jewish Theological Seminary of America semikhah recipients
Rabbis from New York City
Reconstructionist Zionist rabbis
Religious leaders from Rochester, New York
Philosophers of Judaism
Process theologians
20th-century novelists
DeWitt Clinton High School alumni
Columbia University alumni